Ataxia crypta is a species of beetle in the family Cerambycidae. It was described by Thomas Say in 1831, originally under the genus Lamia. It is known from the United States and Mexico.

References

Ataxia (beetle)
Beetles described in 1831